AS Hammamet, is a Tunisian basketball club based in Hammamet. Established in 1945, the team currently plays in the Championnat National B, the second national tier.

In 2013, the club was runner-up in the Arab Club Basketball Championship.

Honours
Arab Championship
Runners-up (1): 2017

References

External links
Facebook page
Basketball teams in Tunisia
Basketball teams established in 1945